Thomas Morton is a writer and television host. He was a contributing editor for Vice magazine who  began working at Vice following a summer internship in 2004. After several years helping edit the print edition of the magazine, he became Vice.com's online editor.
During his tenure at the magazine, Morton wrote first-hand accounts of infiltrating religious cults, competitive binge-eating and living with a Dominican family for a week. He was also the first non-Juggalo to attend and report on the Gathering of the Juggalos.

When Vice launched its online video channel VBS.tv in 2007, Morton began appearing as an on-air correspondent in numerous documentaries and video series, covering environmental catastrophes in the Pacific Ocean, the Louisiana Gulf coast, and the Brazilian Amazon. He also interviewed rapper and fellow Georgian Young Jeezy.

Morton has been a producer and correspondent for HBO's news magazine series Vice since 2013. According to his bio on HBO's website, he is a fan of English jangle-pop in the style of groups like Felt and Biff Bang Pow!.

From 2014 to 2015, Morton served as a field reporter and host for Noisey's music documentaries Noisey Chiraq and Noisey Atlanta.

In early 2016, Vice began broadcasting a new television channel, VICELAND. Thomas Morton hosted a long-form, pop anthropology docuseries called Balls Deep, which features in-depth investigative pieces focused on different American subcultures in each episode. Thomas Morton's investigative journalism serves as the inspiration for the Netflix series Dark Tourist (TV series).

On May 15th, 2020, Morton tweeted that he was laid off from Vice in 2019.

References 

Living people
American male journalists
1983 births